Phycis blennoides, the greater forkbeard, is a species of fish belonging to the family Phycidae.

It is native to Europe, Northern Africa, Northern America.

References

Phycidae
Taxa named by Morten Thrane Brünnich
Fish described in 1768